Folk Roots, New Routes is a collaborative folk album by Shirley Collins and Davy Graham, released by Decca in 1964.

The album was produced by Ray Horricks and recorded by Gus Dudgeon; the sleeve featured a photograph by Crispian Woodgate and sleeve notes by Austin John Marshall.

According to Bob Stanley, the album took inspiration from the North African scale, modal music and Miles Davis; it was the first time many of these English folk songs had been recorded with guitar backing.

Track listing

Personnel
 Shirley Collins: vocals; five-string banjo ("The Cherry Tree Carol")
 Davy Graham: guitar

Reception
Folk Roots, New Routes is regarded as a landmark album of the folk revival; Jude Rogers writing for NPR called it "an uncompromising work that spearheaded innovation in the middle of the folk music revival. It set a template for the folk-rock that followed it, and inspired 21st century psych-folk decades later." It is described as a template for Fairport Convention's Liege & Lief (1969).

References

Shirley Collins albums
1964 albums